The 2017 Asia Oceania Wheelchair Basketball Championships for men and women were held at the China Disability Sports Training Centre in Beijing, from 23 to 28 October 2017. The men's tournament was won by the Australian Rollers. Iran came second, and Japan overcame Korea in the bronze medal game to come third. In the women's competition, China defeated the Australian Gliders in the gold medal match, while Japan defeated Iran in the bronze medal.

Venue

The competition was held at the China Disability Sports Training Centre in Beijing. This is a purpose-built centre for disability sports. Opened on 28 June 2007, it was the first facility in China entirely devoted to disability sports training, and is the largest of its kind in the world. The Chinese Paralympic team used it as its training and preparation centre for the 2008 Summer Paralympics in Beijing. The entire complex is wheelchair accessible, with large elevators and wide halls.

Format
The competition was held from 23 to 28 October 2017. Fourteen teams contested the men's competition. The teams were divided into four pools:
 Pool A: Australia, Chinese Taipei, Iraq
 Pool B: Japan, Hong Kong, Kuwait
 Pool C: Iran, Thailand, Saudi Arabia, New Zealand
 Pool D: Korea, China, United Arab Emirates, Afghanistan
The teams in each pool played a round robin competition. The top team in Pool A then played the second in Pool B, the top in Pool B played the second in Pool A, the top in Pool C played the second in Pool D, and the top in Pool D played the second in Pool C in the quarterfinals. The winners then played in the semifinals, and the winners of the semifinals played in the gold medal match.

The prize for the top four teams was admission to the 2018 World Wheelchair Basketball Championships in Hamburg, Germany.

In the women's competition, there were only four teams, so they formed just one pool, and went straight into the semifinals. Only two positions were available for women's teams from Asia-Oceania in Hamburg, where the women's competition will be held concurrently with the men's.

Squads

Women's competition

Head coach: David Gould 
Assistant coaches: Stephen Charlton 
Physiotherapist: Anna Rich 
Team Manager: Cathy Lambert

Source:

Team Manager: Chen Weidong
Coach group leader: Xu YuanshengCoach: Chen QiCoach:Han Yan

Source:

Head coach: Mehri YoussefzadehsaniCoach: Solkmaz DehghanTeam Manager: Hourish Baradaran

Source:

Head coach: Kaori TachibanaAssistant Coach: Kyoko TsukamotoTeam Staff: Natsuki IshidaInterpreter: Yurie Myamoto  

Source:

Men's competition

Head coach: Craig Friday
Assistant coach: Brad Ness
Assistant/Technical coach: Shane Furness
Physiotherapist: Jesse Adams

Source:

Head Coach: Swee Haw Chee
Team Manager: Chiu Wah Wong
Team Physiotherapist: Hong Ki Maggie Ho

Source:

Team Manager: Zhao Qian
Team Leader: Yang Weiping
Coach: Zhai Youngjun
Coach: Cul Manfeng

Source:

Head coach: Mohammadreza Dastyar
Coach: Maziyar Mirazimi
Wheelchair Technician: Feridon Kheshtzar
Team Manager: Habib Khomjani

Source:

Head of Delegation: Khaid Al-Kaabawi
Administrator: Abbas Al-Kawaawi
Coach: Mohanad Al-Sammaraie 
Coach: Qusay Al-Angurli
Therapist: Hakeem Al-Ismee

Source:

Head of Delegation:  Naser Alajmi
Team Manager: Mohammad Alainati
Head Coach: Hosan Galab
Assistant Coach: Ahmad Alshatti

Source:

Team Staff: Abdulalah Almuqrin
Team Staff: Ibrahim Younesbr 
Team Staff: Ibrahim Bessai
Team Staff: Kaled Alabdali

Source:

Coach: Jess Markt
Coach: Qawamudim Chafori
Physiotherapist: Mohammad Ayub Rahimi
Physiotherapist: Mohammad Afzal Asiami
Senior Advisor/Manager: Alberto Cairo

Source:

Head Coach: Shimpei 
Assistant Coach: Kazuyuki Kyoya
Physical Coach: Masato Arima
Coordinator: Hiromi Kosugi

Source:

Team Manager: Phatharabhandhu Krissana  
Head Coach: Aghacoucheki Abbas
Assistant Coach: Pittaya Prathin
Assistant Coach: Akapol Kunpradit

Source:

Head Coach: Shane Davies 
Assistant Coach: Glenn McDonald 
Team Manager: Michelle Davies

Source:

Coach: Sa Hyun Han 
Assistant Coach: Heejun Kang
Trainer: Young Jun Kim
Team Manager: Seonyeon Lee

Source:

Head Coach: Chi-Yang Tsai
Coach: Hsin-Liang Lo 
Coach: Pei-Ni Tai
Team Leader: Fou-Hwan Lai
Team Manager: Ting-Chi Pan
Wheelchiar Technician: Ken-Jung Chen

Source:

Women's competition

Round robin stage

Finals

Men's competition

Round robin stage

Finals 

 13th/14th

 9–12

 9–12

 Quarterfinal 1

 Quarterfinal 2

 Quarterfinal 3

 Quarterfinal 4

 11th/12th

 9th/10th

 5–8

 5–8

 Semifinal 1

 Semifinal 2

 7th/8th

 5th/6th

 Bronze Medal

 Gold Medal

All Stars

Men
 
  All Star Five
 Mohammadhasan Sayari (Iran – 4.0)
 Jannik Blair (Australia – 1.0)
 Dong Suk Oh (South Korea – 2.0)
 Tom O'Neill-Thorne (Australia – 3.0)
 Hiroaki Kozai (Japan – 3.5)

 Most Valuable Player
 Omid Hadiazhar (Iran – 4.0)

Source:

Women

 All Star Five
 Mari Amimoto (Japan  – 4.5)
 Cobi Crispin (Australia –  4.0)
 Xuejing Chen (China – 1.0)
 Clare Nott (Australia – 1.0)
 Suiling Lin (China – 3.0)

 Most Valuable Player
 Amber Merritt (AUS – 4.5)
Source:

Final standings

Men

Women

See also
 2007 Asia Oceania Wheelchair Basketball Championships
 2009 Asia Oceania Wheelchair Basketball Championships
 2011 Asia Oceania Wheelchair Basketball Championships
 2013 Asia Oceania Wheelchair Basketball Championships
 2015 Asia Oceania Wheelchair Basketball Championships
 2019 Asia Oceania Wheelchair Basketball Championships
 2021 Asia Oceania Wheelchair Basketball Championships

Notes 

2010s in Beijing
2017 in Chinese sport
2017 in wheelchair basketball
International basketball competitions hosted by China
October 2017 sports events in Asia
Wheelchair basketball in China